Aleksei Aleksandrovich Kutsenko (born 26 December 1972) is a former Russian professional footballer.

Club career
He made his professional debut in the Soviet Second League in 1991 for FC Dynamo-2 Moscow.

Honours
 Russian Premier League runner-up: 1994.
 Russian Premier League bronze: 1997.
 Russian Cup winner: 1995.
 Russian Cup finalist: 1997.
 Russian Third League Zone 3 top scorer: 1995 (35 goals).

European club competitions
With FC Dynamo Moscow.

 UEFA Cup 1994–95: 1 game.
 UEFA Cup Winners' Cup 1995–96: 2 games.
 UEFA Cup 1996–97: 1 game.
 UEFA Intertoto Cup 1997: 6 games, 1 goal.

References

1972 births
Footballers from Moscow
Living people
Soviet footballers
Russian footballers
FC Dynamo Moscow players
FC Chernomorets Novorossiysk players
FC Sokol Saratov players
FC Arsenal Tula players
Russian Premier League players
Association football forwards
FC Saturn Ramenskoye players